Marja Anneli Risku-Repola (born 5 March 1954) is a Finnish speed skater. She competed in four events at the 1980 Winter Olympics.

Her daughter, Elina Risku, is also a speed skater.

References

External links
 

1954 births
Living people
Finnish female speed skaters
Olympic speed skaters of Finland
Speed skaters at the 1980 Winter Olympics
People from Seinäjoki
Sportspeople from South Ostrobothnia